Sport Club Santa Rita is a currently inactive Brazilian football club based in Boca da Mata, Alagoas. The team currently doesn't play in any league, having last participated in the Campeonato Alagoano in the 2018 season.

History
The club was founded on 3 January 1974 as Associação Atlética Santa Rita. They won the Second Division of the Campeonato Alagoano in 2007.

Achievements
 Campeonato Alagoano Second Level:
 Winners (1): 2007

Stadium
Santa Rita play their home games at Estádio Olival Elias de Moraes. The stadium has a maximum capacity of 3,500 people.

References

Association football clubs established in 1974
Football clubs in Alagoas
1974 establishments in Brazil
Inactive football clubs in Brazil